Palimbolus elegans is a beetle in the Staphylinidae (rove beetle) family, which is found in Tasmania.

It was first described by Arthur Mills Lea in 1911 from male and female specimens collected on Mount Wellington and other places in Tasmania

Description
Lea describes the species:

References 

Beetles described in 1911
Taxa named by Arthur Mills Lea
Pselaphinae